Siavash Kola or Seyavash Kola or Siavosh Kala may refer to:
 Siavash Kola, Neka
 Siavash Kola, Sari